Hague v. Committee for Industrial Organization, 307 U.S. 496 (1939), is a US labor law case decided by the United States Supreme Court.

Facts
In Jersey City, New Jersey, Mayor Frank Hague had in 1937 used a city ordinance to prevent labor meetings in public places and stop the distribution of literature pertaining to the Committee for Industrial Organization's cause. He referred to the CIO as "communist."

Judgment
District and circuit courts ruled in favor of the CIO, which brought the suit against the mayor for these actions and which was represented by Morris L. Ernst, Spaulding Frazer, Lee Pressman and Benjamin Kaplan. Hague appealed to the Supreme Court which ruled against him and held that Hague's ban on political meetings violated the First Amendment right to freedom of assembly, and so the ordinances were void.

See also
US labor law
History of labor law in the United States
List of United States Supreme Court cases, volume 307

Notes

External links
 
 
 First Amendment Library entry on Hague

1939 in United States case law
Freedom of assembly
United States Supreme Court cases
United States Supreme Court cases of the Hughes Court
United States labor case law
United States Free Speech Clause case law
Congress of Industrial Organizations
American Civil Liberties Union litigation
History of Jersey City, New Jersey